Tandangongoro is an administrative ward in Lindi Municipal District of Lindi Region in Tanzania. 
According to the 2012 census, the ward has a total population of 3,550.

References

Wards of Lindi Region